Treuchtlingen station is now the only station in the town of Treuchtlingen in the German state of Bavaria. The town used also to have stations at Graben, Möhren, Gundelsheim and Wettelsheim. Treuchtlingen station has seven platform tracks and it is classified by Deutsche Bahn as a category 3 station. The station is served by about 110 trains daily operated by DB Regio and DB long-distance. The station is a railway junction on the Nuremberg–Augsburg, Ingolstadt–Treuchtlingen and Treuchtlingen–Würzburg lines.

Location
The station is located in northern Treuchtlingen. It is bordered to the west by Wettelsheimer Straße and to the east by Bahnhofsstraße, which is also the location of the entrance building. A bridge connects these streets south of the premises of the railway station. The address of the station is 61 Bahnhofsstraße.

History
Treuchtlingen station was opened  on 2 October 1869 together with both the Ansbach–Treuchtlingen  section of the line to Würzburg and the Treuchtlingen–Pleinfeld lines. The Treuchtlingen–Pleinfeld section was built together with the Ingolstadt–Treuchtlingen railway. Opposite the station building there was a small depot for the maintenance of the trains. In 1870 Treuchtlingen received another link to the rail network with the completion of the Munich–Ingolstadt–Treuchtlingen–Nuremberg railway. On 1 October 1906, the Donauwörth–Treuchtlingen line was opened, which was previously regarded as uneconomic to build because of the gradients required. This completed the direct Nuremberg–Augsburg line and made the detour of the Ludwig South-North Railway through Nördlingen unnecessary. On 23 February 1945, an air raid on the station as part of Operation Clarion killed about 600 people, including about 300 taking shelter in the station underpass. With the completion of the Nuremberg–Munich high-speed railway in late 2006 the station lost most of the long-distance services between Nuremberg and Munich that had previously stopped there.

Infrastructure
The station has seven platform tracks next to four platforms, with platform 1 next to the entrance building. Each platform is covered and has a digital platform display. All platforms are connected by a pedestrian tunnel connected to platform 1. The station is accessible by wheelchair and there is a step-free access to each platform. At the station there is parking and bus connections to Weißenburg, Bieswang, Solnhofen, Gunzenhausen, Langenaltheim, Polsingen and Gundelsheim available. The station is located in the regional transport area administered by the Verkehrsverbund Großraum Nürnberg (Greater Nuremberg Transport Association, VGN).

Platform data
 Platform 1: length 145 m, height 55 cm
 Platform 2: length 293 m, height 55 cm
 Platform 3: length 293 m, height 55 cm
 Platform 4: length 382 m, height 76 cm
 Platform 5: length 382 m, height 76 cm
 Platform 6: length 290 m, height 55 cm
 Platform 7: length 290 m, height 55 cm

Rail services

Long-distance
The station is served by individual long-distance services operated by Deutsche Bahn.

Regional 
Treuchtlingen station is served by four Regional-Express services and two Regionalbahn services operated by DB Regio.

References

External links 

 

Railway stations in Bavaria
Railway stations in Germany opened in 1869
1869 establishments in Bavaria
Buildings and structures in Weißenburg-Gunzenhausen